Pyatiletka refers to the five-year plans for the national economy of the Soviet Union.

Pyatiletka may also refer to:
 Pyatiletka, Austrumsky Selsoviet, Iglinsky District, Republic of Bashkortostan
 Pyatiletka, Nadezhdinsky Selsoviet, Iglinsky District, Republic of Bashkortostan
 2122 Pyatiletka, a stony asteroid

See also 
 Vtoraya Pyatiletka (disambiguation)